Alberto Martín was the defending champion, but lost in the first round.

Fernando Vicente won the title, defeating Sébastien Grosjean 6–4, 4–6, 7–6(7–3) in the final.

Seeds

  Younes El Aynaoui (quarterfinals)
  Karim Alami (second round)
  Hicham Arazi (quarterfinals)
  Sébastien Grosjean (final)
  Marc Rosset (first round)
  Fernando Vicente (champion)
  Mariano Puerta (semifinals)
  Arnaud di Pasquale (semifinals)

Draw

Finals

Top half

Bottom half

External links
 Association of Tennis Professionals (ATP) – 2000 Grand Prix Hassan II Men's Singles draw

2000 ATP Tour
Singles